Tobiae matrimonium, actio sacra pro filiabus chori S. Lazari is a 1794 oratorio by Simon Mayr to a Latin libretto by Giuseppe Maria Foppa. It was the third of Mayr's works written for the Ospedale dei Mendicanti. No exact date or circumstances for the original performance are known.

Recordings
 Raguel - Judith Spiesser (soprano), Anna – Margriet Buchberger (soprano), Sara – Cornelia (soprano), Tobias – Stefanie Iranyi (mezzo), archangel Raphael – Susanne Bernhard (soprano). Simon Mayr Chorus and Ensemble, director and harpsichord Franz Hauk. recorded 14-18 July 2007, Assam church of Maria de Victoria, Ingolstadt, Germany. 2CD Naxos

References

1794 compositions
Oratorios by Simon Mayr